John Thomas Stone (October 10, 1905 – November 30, 1955), nicknamed "Rocky,"  was an American baseball outfielder. He played 11 season in Major League Baseball for the Detroit Tigers (1928–1933) and Washington Senators (1934–1938). Stone hit over .300 seven times and had a career batting average of .310.

Early years
Stone was born in 1905 in Lynchburg, Tennessee.  He attended Maryville College from 1925 to 1928. The school's baseball team was 15-2 in Stone's senior year.

Professional baseball

Detroit Tigers
Stone signed with the Detroit Tigers and, after a short stint in the minor leagues at Evansville, he appeared in his first major league game on August 31, 1928, just a few months after leaving college. In his first partial season, Stone hit an impressive .354 in 26 games with 15 extra base hits and a .549 slugging percentage.

In 1929, Stone's batting average dropped 94 points to .260, but he returned to solid hitting in 1930 with a .311 batting average and a .452 slugging percentage. During July and August 1930, Stone had a 27-game hitting streak. Only five Detroit Tigers (Ty Cobb, Goose Goslin, Ron LeFlore, Dale Alexander, and Pete Fox) have had longer hitting streaks.

Stone's fourth big league season in 1931 was his best. His .327 batting average was 10th best in the American League. He led the league in singles (142) and was also among the league leaders with 191 hits, 11 triples, and 13 stolen bases. Stone was also 16th in the American League's Most Valuable Player voting for 1931.

In 1932, Stone continued as one of the top batters in the league, with 64 extra base hits, 108 RBIs and a .486 slugging percentage. He ranked ninth in the American League with 283 total bases and also ranked among the Top 10 in triples, home runs and RBIs.

On April 30, 1933, Stone became the first major leaguer to collect six extra base hits in a regulation length doubleheader‚ as he collected four doubles and two home runs against the St. Louis Browns. He finished the 1933 season with a .283 batting average, a .434 slugging percentage, and 55 extra base hits.

On December 13, 1933, Stone was traded to the Washington Senators in exchange for Goose Goslin. Goslin went on to help the Tigers win back-to-back pennants in 1934 and 1935, while the Senators dropped from first place to seventh place in 1934.

Washington Senators
Stone played for Washington for five seasons from 1934 to 1938, appearing in 556 games and compiling a .317 batting average, .393 on-base percentage, and .476 slugging percentage. Stone retired from baseball after the 1938 season due to a lung ailment.

Career statistics

Later years
Stone was married to Ruth Ellis Stone. They had a son, John T. Stone, Jr., and a daughter, Suzanne Stone. 

When his playing career ended, Stone retired to his farm in Bedford County, Tennessee. He died of a heart attack in 1955 at his home in Shelbyville, Tennessee. He was 50 years old when he died. He was buried at the Odd Fellows-Masonic Cemetery in Lynchburg.

See also

 List of Major League Baseball career triples leaders

References

External links

1905 births
1955 deaths
Major League Baseball outfielders
Baseball players from Tennessee
Maryville Scots baseball players
Detroit Tigers players
Washington Senators (1901–1960) players
People from Lynchburg, Tennessee